Kang Sin-young (also Kang Sin-yeong, ; born March 20, 1977) is a South Korean judoka, who played for the lightweight category. She won a silver medal for her division at the 2008 Asian Judo Championships in Jeju City, and bronze at the 2006 Asian Games in Doha, Qatar.

Kang represented South Korea at the 2008 Summer Olympics in Beijing, where she competed for the women's lightweight class (57 kg). Unfortunately, she lost the first preliminary round match to Brazil's Ketleyn Quadros, who successfully scored a yuko and a te gatame (hand armlock), at the end of the five-minute period.

References

External links

NBC 2008 Olympics profile

Living people
Olympic judoka of South Korea
Judoka at the 2008 Summer Olympics
Asian Games medalists in judo
1977 births
Judoka at the 2006 Asian Games
South Korean female judoka
Asian Games bronze medalists for South Korea
Medalists at the 2006 Asian Games
20th-century South Korean women
21st-century South Korean women